Carlo Salamano (1891 - 19 January 1969) was an Italian racecar driver. A resident of Turin, in 1923 he drove a FIAT 805 to win the Italian Grand Prix at Monza, the event also serving as the inaugural European Grand Prix; it was the first victory by an automobile equipped with a supercharger in a significant European event. While an official championship had yet to be established, he was considered to be the season champion by historians.

Following his retirement from racing competition, Salamano acted as the leader of Fiat's vehicle testing department, being described as the company's "technical conscience". He retired from Fiat in 1962.

References

External links
 

1891 births
1969 deaths
Racing drivers from Turin